Simon is an 1835 French novel by George Sand.

References

Novels by George Sand
1835 French novels